The Roman Catholic Diocese of Miarinarivo is a diocese located in the city of Miarinarivo in the Ecclesiastical province of Antananarivo in Madagascar.

History
 December 13, 1933: Established as Mission “sui iuris” of Miarinarivo
 May 25, 1939: Promoted as Apostolic Vicariate of Miarinarivo
 September 14, 1955: Promoted as Diocese of Miarinarivo

Bishops
 Vicar Apostolic of Miarinarivo (Roman rite) 
 Bishop Ignazio Ramarosandratana (1939.05.25 – 1955.09.14); see below
 Bishops of Miarinarivo (Roman rite)
 Bishop Ignazio Ramarosandratana (1955.09.14 – 1957);  see above
 Bishop Édouard Ranaivo (1958.06.24 – 1959.04.30)
 Bishop François Xavier Rajaonarivo (1960.04.05 – 1985.11.15)
 Bishop Armand Toasy (1987.07.03 – 1993.10.18)
 Archbishop Armand Gaétan Razafindratandra (Apostolic Administrator 1994.07 – 1998.02.14) (Cardinal later in 1994)
 Bishop Raymond Razakarinvony (1998.02.14 – 2007.02.15)
 Bishop Jean Claude Randrianarisoa (since 2007.02.15)

Other priest of this diocese who became bishop
Roger Victor Rakotondrajao, appointed Coadjutor Bishop of Mahajanga in 2008

See also
Roman Catholicism in Madagascar

Sources
 GCatholic.org
 Catholic Hierarchy

Roman Catholic dioceses in Madagascar
Christian organizations established in 1933
Roman Catholic dioceses and prelatures established in the 20th century
Roman Catholic Ecclesiastical Province of Antananarivo
1933 establishments in Madagascar